The 2004 NCAA Division II men's basketball tournament was the 48th annual single-elimination tournament to determine the national champion of men's NCAA Division II college basketball in the United States.

Officially culminating the 2003–04 NCAA Division II men's basketball season, the tournament featured sixty-four teams from around the country.

The Elite Eight, national semifinals, and championship were played at the Centennial Garden in Bakersfield, California, previously the venue of the 2001 finals.

Kennesaw State (35–4) defeated Southern Indiana in the final, 84–59, to win their first Division II national championship. 

The Owls were coached by Tony Ingle. Kennesaw State's Terrence Hill was the Most Outstanding Player.

Regionals

Great Lakes - Romeoville, Illinois 
Location: Neil Carey Arena Host: Lewis University

South Central - Stephenville, Texas 
Location: Wisdom Gymnasium Host: Tarleton State University

South - Valdosta, Georgia 
Location: The Complex Host: Valdosta State University

North Central - Denver, Colorado 
Location: Auraria Events Center Host: Metropolitan State University

East - Misenheimer, North Carolina 
Location: Merner Gym Host: Pfeiffer University

South Atlantic - Kennesaw, Georgia 
Location: KSU Convocation Center Host: Kennesaw State University

Northeast - Lowell, Massachusetts 
Location: Costello Gym Host: University of Massachusetts at Lowell

West - San Bernardino, California 
Location: Coussoulis Arena Host: California State University, San Bernardino

Elite Eight-Bakersfield, California
Location: Bakersfield Centennial Garden Host: California State University, Bakersfield

All-tournament team
 Terrence Hill, Kennesaw State (MOP)
 Georgy Joseph, Kennesaw State
 Cris Brunson, Southern Indiana
 Joe Gordon, Southern Indiana
 Luke Kendall, Metro State

See also
 2004 NCAA Division II women's basketball tournament
 2004 NCAA Division I men's basketball tournament
 2004 NCAA Division III men's basketball tournament
 2004 NAIA Division I men's basketball tournament
 2004 NAIA Division II men's basketball tournament

References
 2004 NCAA Division II men's basketball tournament jonfmorse.com
 NCAA Division II men's basketball tournament Results

NCAA Division II men's basketball tournament
NCAA Division II basketball tournament
NCAA Division II basketball tournament